Walter J. Fourt (August 31, 1899 - July 4, 1977) served in the California State Assembly for the 38th district from 1943 to 1947 and during World War I he served in the United States Army.

References

United States Army personnel of World War I
Members of the California State Legislature
1889 births
1977 deaths
20th-century American politicians
People from Fairfield, Iowa